Melville Fuller (1833–1910) was chief justice of the United States. Justice Fuller''' may also refer to:

Jerome Fuller (1808–1880), chief justice of Minnesota Territorial Supreme Court
Thomas Charles Fuller (1832–1901), justice of the United States Court of Private Land Claims